The Roger Neilson Memorial Award is awarded annually to the top academic post-secondary school (college or university) player in the Ontario Hockey League. The award is named in honour of Hockey Hall of Fame coach Roger Neilson, a former high school teacher, and former coach of the Peterborough Petes.

Winners
List of recipients of the Roger Neilson Memorial Award.

See also
 Bobby Smith Trophy (Top academic player combined with on-ice performance)
 Ivan Tennant Memorial Award (Top academic high school player)
 List of Canadian Hockey League awards

References

External links
 Ontario Hockey League

Ontario Hockey League trophies and awards
Awards established in 2005